Simana Periye is a 1977 Bangladeshi film starring Jayshree Kabir, Bulbul Ahmed and Bollywood actress Tanuja alongside a few others. Ahmed garnered Bangladesh National Film Award for Best Actor for his performance in the film.

Cast 
 Tanuja
 Bulbul Ahmed
 Jayshree Kabir

Soundtrack

Awards 
Bangladesh National Film Awards
 Best Actor - Bulbul Ahmed
 Best Screenplay - Alamgir Kabir
 Best Dialogue - Alamgir Kabir

References

1977 films
Bengali-language Bangladeshi films
Films scored by Bhupen Hazarika
Films scored by Rabindranath Tagore
1970s Bengali-language films
Films directed by Alamgir Kabir